Qosmalyan (also, Qosməliyon, Gosmalyan, and Kasmal’yan) is a village and municipality in the Lerik Rayon of Azerbaijan. It has a population of 854.  The municipality consists of the villages of Qosmalyan, Digah, Lələkəran, Çokərə, Tatoni, and Hivəri. The main village lies on the A323 road.

References 

Populated places in Lerik District